The 2016–17 season is a FC Ararat Yerevan's 26th consecutive season in Armenian Premier League. This article shows player statistics and all official matches that the club will play during the 2016–17 season.

Season events
On 5 July 2016, Ararat announced that they would host Persian Gulf Pro League club Esteghlal on 7 July.

On 15 July, Raffi Kaya left Ararat to sign for Swiss club Stade Nyonnais, whilst also announcing the signing of Nassim Aaron Kpehia and Brahima Bruno Koné from Mika.

On 1 August, Ararat announced the signings of Aram Ayrapetyan, Argishti Petrosyan, Hakob and Aram Loretsyan, Karen Avoyan, Happy Simelela and Kouadio Brou. Two days later, Ararat also signed Marat Daudov, Gevorg Poghosyan and Rafael Ghazaryan.

On 6 August 2016, Arkady Andreasyan was appointed as the club's manager in early August 2016.

On 14 October, Ararat announced that they had terminated their contracts with Happy Simelela, Kouadio Brou, Pol Asu Oshi and Brahima Bruno Koné by mutual consent. Two weeks later, Ararat also announced they had terminated their contracts with Souleymane Kone, Oumarou Kaina and Kyrian Nwabueze, also by mutual consent.

On 20 December, Ararat announced wholesale changes to their squad, with Erik Nazaryan, Gor Poghosyan, Revik Yeghiazaryan, David Minasyan, Andranik Kocharyan and Edgar Mkrtchyan all signing for the club, whilst Petros Ter-Petrosyan, Aram Loretsyan, Davit Markosyan and Nassim Aaron Kpehia all left the club.

In February 2017, Ararat moved their home games from the Republican Stadium to Mika Stadium due to renovation work that was needed to be carried out at the Republican Stadium.

Squad

Transfers

In

Out

Loans out

Released

Friendlies

Competitions

Premier League

Results summary

Results by round

Results

Table

Armenian Cup

Statistics

Appearances and goals

|-
|colspan="14"|Players who left Ararat Yerevan during the season:

|}

Goal scorers

Clean sheets

Disciplinary Record

References

FC Ararat Yerevan seasons
Ararat Yerevan